Hazai is a Hungarian surname. Notable people with this surname include:

 Attila Hazai (1967–2012), Hungarian writer
 Kálmán Hazai (1913–1996), Hungarian water polo player
 László Hazai (born 1953), Hungarian chess grandmaster
 Samu Hazai (1851–1942), Hungarian military officer and politician

Hungarian-language surnames